"Bring It All Back" is the debut single of British pop group S Club 7. It was co-written by S Club 7, Eliot Kennedy, Mike Percy and Tim Lever for the group's debut studio album S Club (1999). Kennedy, Percy, and Lever also produced the song. It was released on 7 June 1999 as the album's lead single. "Bring It All Back" was used as the theme for the band's first CBBC series Miami 7 as well.

"Bring It All Back" was a chart success, reaching the top spot in the United Kingdom and New Zealand whilst also peaking within the top ten in Ireland and Sweden. The song was released in North America on 28 September 1999, shortly before their television show Miami 7 became popular in the United States. It has sold 675,000 copies in the UK as of May 2015. In 2017, ShortList's Dave Fawbert listed 'Bring It All Back' as containing "one of the greatest key changes in music history".

Song information
"Bring It All Back" is notable for being the only S Club 7 single on which all four female members share lead vocals. The first verse is shared by Jo O'Meara and Rachel Stevens, while the second verse is split between Tina Barrett and Hannah Spearritt. Bradley McIntosh, Jon Lee and Paul Cattermole provide backing vocals and additional vocals on the final chorus. The single contains an extended version of the track with an additional refrain and chorus, as well as a club remix by K-Klass, which appears on all international versions of the single.

The single also contains two B-sides, "So Right" and "Hello Friend". "So Right" features in the sixth episode of Miami 7, and as a bonus track on the Japanese version of the band's debut album, and is an up-tempo R&B number. "Hello Friend", a ballad duet between O'Meara and Lee with additional backing vocals, was one of only three songs from the band's debut album era not performed during Miami 7, alongside "Our Time Has Come" and "Friday Night". However, it was later performed during Viva S Club to mark Cattermole's departure from the band. It was later added to the setlist of the Bring It All Back 2015 tour as an intimate duet between O'Meara and Lee.

Critical reception
Daily Record commented, "The latest catchy lite pop offering from the latest band whose pigeon hole is marked manufactured. More catchy than sticky willies."

Music video
Two music videos exist for the track. The first, recorded for use in the British and Australian markets, features newly recorded scenes of the band performing the track on a beach stage in Miami, recorded during the filming of Miami 7, as well as additional montage clips from several episodes of the series. The end of the video shows a group of people watching the band as the cameras pull away. Most notably, there are two beach stage scenes in the video that show Barrett with a different hairstyle compared to the rest of the video. This version of the video was shown for the first time on the British music chart show Top of the Pops on 30 April 1999, with S Club 7 introducing it following a short interview with Jamie Theakston.

The second video was recorded for use in the United States, and features scenes of the band performing the song in an American trailer park (recorded during the filming of the band's TV special Boyfriends and Birthdays), as well as in a courtroom, scenes taken from episode 10 of Miami 7, "Court in the Act". The video also features clips of the band performing the song poolside, which are taken from the opening credits of the series.

Track listings

 UK CD1
 "Bring It All Back"
 "So Right"
 "Bring It All Back" (extended mix)
 "Bring It All Back" (CD ROM video)

 UK CD2 
 "Bring It All Back"
 "Hello Friend"
 "Bring It All Back" (K-Klass Club Mix)

 UK cassette single
 "Bring It All Back"
 "So Right"

 Australian CD single 
 "Bring It All Back"
 "So Right"
 "Bring It All Back" (K-Klass Club Mix)
 "Bring It All Back" (CD ROM video)

 US CD single
 "Bring It All Back"
 "Bring It All Back" (K-Klass Club Mix)
 "S Club 7 in Miami" (CD-Rom Trailer)

Credits and personnel
Credits are lifted from the S Club album booklet.

Studios
 Recorded at Steelworks Studios (Sheffield, England)
 Mastered at Transfermation (London, England)

Personnel

 Eliot Kennedy – writing, production
 Mike Percy – writing, production
 Tim Lever – writing, production
 S Club 7 – writing
 Andy Wright – additional production
 Mark "Spike" Stent – mixing
 Jan Kybert – mixing assistant
 Noel Summerville – mastering
 Richard Dowling – mastering

Charts

Weekly charts

Year-end charts

Decade-end charts

Certifications

Cover versions
In November 1999, the students of Hamilton, New Zealand's Aberdeen Primary School sang the song to then-Prime Minister of New Zealand Jenny Shipley. The song was also covered by Taiwanese pop singer Jolin Tsai and re-titled "Don't Stop" for the 2000 album Don't Stop. Korean girl group GFriend also covered the song at various music festivals. On 21 May 2021, Lucy Spraggan released her cover.

References

1999 debut singles
1999 songs
Music television series theme songs
Number-one singles in Scotland
Polydor Records singles
S Club 7 songs
Song recordings produced by Eliot Kennedy
Songs written by Eliot Kennedy
Songs written by Mike Percy (musician)
Songs written by Tim Lever
UK Singles Chart number-one singles